Chittagong-5 is a constituency represented in the Jatiya Sangsad (National Parliament) of Bangladesh since 2014 by Anisul Islam Mahmud of the Jatiya Party (Ershad).

Boundaries 
The constituency encompasses Hathazari Upazila and Chittagong City Corporation wards 1 and 2.

History 
The constituency was created for the first general elections in newly independent Bangladesh, held in 1973.

Ahead of the 2014 general election, the Election Commission shifted the boundaries of the constituency. Previously it had encompassed Raozan Upazila and only one union parishad of Hathazari Upazila: Garduara.

Members of Parliament 
Key

Elections

Elections in the 2010s 
Anisul Islam Mahmud was elected unopposed in the 2014 General Election after opposition parties withdrew their candidacies in a boycott of the election.

Elections in the 2000s

Elections in the 1990s

References

External links
 

Parliamentary constituencies in Bangladesh
Chittagong District